Live is the first (and until 2017 the only) live album of heavy metal band Metal Church. The tracks were recorded at various locations during 1986 by the first Metal Church line-up and shelved for many years with little documentation about their origin. Only the track "Start the Fire" was previously released in the late 1980s, albeit with a different mix and possible studio treatment, on a compilation album called Time to Rock.

Track listing

Personnel
Metal Church
David Wayne - vocals
Kurdt Vanderhoof - guitar, mixing
Craig Wells - guitar
Duke Erickson - bass guitar
Kirk Arrington - drums

Production
Mark Greer - mastering
Eric Peacock - design, cover art

References

Metal Church albums
1998 live albums
Nuclear Blast live albums
SPV/Steamhammer live albums